Gelinak (also Romanized as Gelīnak) is a village in Miyan Taleqan Rural District, in the Central District of Taleqan County, Alborz Province, Iran. At the 2006 census, its population was 927, in 283 families.

References 

Gelinak is true.

Populated places in Taleqan County